Timothy Crispian Sallis (born 24 June 1959) is a British art director. He was nominated for three Academy Awards in the category Best Art Direction for the films Aliens, Driving Miss Daisy and Gladiator. He is the son of actors Peter Sallis and Elaine Usher.

Selected filmography

References

External links

1959 births
Living people
British art directors
Emmy Award winners